Saša Starović (born 19 October 1988) is a Serbian volleyball player, a member of Serbia men's national volleyball team and French club Tourcoing Lille Métropole, a participant of the Olympic Games (Beijing 2008, London 2012), European Champion 2011, bronze medalist of World Championship 2010, medalist of the European Championship and the World League.

Personal life
His sister, Sanja Starović is also a volleyball player.

Career

National team
On July 19, 2015 Serbian national team with him in squad went to the final of World League, but they lost with France 0–3 and achieved silver medal.

Sporting achievements

Clubs

National championships
 2013/2014  Italian Championship, with Lube Banca Macerata
 2016/2017  Greek Championship, with PAOK Thessaloniki

National competitions
 2019/2020  Greek League Cup, with Panathinaikos

European championships
 2015/2016  CEV Challenge Cup, with Calzedonia Verona

National team
 2007  CEV European Championship
 2008  FIVB World League
 2009  FIVB World League
 2010  FIVB World League
 2010  FIVB World Championship
 2011  CEV European Championship
 2013  CEV European Championship
 2015  FIVB World League

Individually
 2009 Memorial of Hubert Jerzy Wagner - Best Server
  2011  Serie A1 League - Most Valuable Player

References

External links
 FIVB profile

Living people
1988 births
People from Trebinje
Serbs of Bosnia and Herzegovina
Serbian men's volleyball players
Olympic volleyball players of Serbia
Volleyball players at the 2008 Summer Olympics
Volleyball players at the 2012 Summer Olympics
Serbian expatriate sportspeople in Montenegro
Expatriate volleyball players in Montenegro
Serbian expatriate sportspeople in Russia
Expatriate volleyball players in Russia
Serbian expatriate sportspeople in Italy
Expatriate volleyball players in Italy
Serbian expatriate sportspeople in Greece
Expatriate volleyball players in Greece
European champions for Serbia
PAOK V.C. players
Panathinaikos V.C. players